Foster is the name of two communities in Wisconsin

Foster, Clark County, Wisconsin, a town
Foster, Eau Claire County, Wisconsin, an unincorporated community